Bihastina is a genus of moths in the family Geometridae.

Species
Bihastina albolucens Prout, 1916
Bihastina subviridata (Bethune-Baker, 1915)
Bihastina viridata (Warren, 1906)

Former species
Bihastina argentipuncta (Warren, 1906)
Bihastina aurantiaca (Prout, 1926)
Bihastina eurychora (Prout, 1928)
Bihastina papuensis (Warren, 1906)

References

External links

Asthenini
Moth genera